Return of 13 Hedgehogs (MxBx Singles 2000–2009) is a compilation album by Melt-Banana. It features 13 more singles, EPs and split records on one CD.

Track listing

Track information 
 Tracks 1–6 from split 8" EP w/ Three Studies for a Crucifixion (Passacaglia Records, 2001)
 Track 7 from split 7-inch EP w/ Dynamite Anna and the Bone Machine (Valium Records, 2001)
 Tracks 8–9 from split 7-inch EP w/ Daemien Frost (Alpha Relish, 2001)
 Tracks 10–11 from split 7-inch EP w/ The Locust (Gold Standard Laboratories, 2002)
 Tracks 12–13 from split 7-inch EP w/ Big D and the Kids Table (Fork in Hand Records, 2002)
 Tracks 14–16 from 666 6" EP (Level Plane Records, 2002)
 Tracks 17–18 from split 7-inch EP w/ Narcosis (SuperFi Records/Speedowax Records, 2004)
 Tracks 19–21 from Quick Slow Death split 10-inch EP w/ Chung (Sounds of Subterrania, 2005)
 Track 22 from split 5" EP w/ Fantômas (Unhip Records, 2005)
 Tracks 23–24 from 5" EP Ai No Uta (HG Fact, 2006)
 Track 25 from split Mini CD EP w/ Fat Day (Dark Beloved Cloud, 2007)
 Track 26 from split 7-inch EP w/ Young Widows (Temporary Residence Limited, 2009)
 Tracks 27–29 from Initial T. 7-inch EP (Init Records, 2009)

References

Melt-Banana compilation albums
2015 compilation albums